The Interactive Fiction Collections is a video game series developed by Infocom and published by Activision for the PC.

Contents
The Interactive Fiction Collections are a series of five collections, with themes consisting of Fantasy, Mystery, Adventure, Sci-Fi, and Comedy.

 The Mystery Collection  (1995; contained Deadline, The Lurking Horror, Moonmist, Sherlock: The Riddle of the Crown Jewels, Suspect and The Witness. Zork Zero and Planetfall were a bonus in some packages)
 The Adventure Collection (1995; contained Border Zone, Plundered Hearts, Cutthroats, Trinity and Infidel)
 The Comedy Collection (1995; contained Bureaucracy, Hollywood Hijinx and Nord and Bert Couldn't Make Head or Tail of It)
 The Fantasy Collection (1995; contained Spellbreaker, Enchanter, Sorcerer, Seastalker and Wishbringer)
 The Science Fiction Collection (1995; contained Suspended, A Mind Forever Voyaging, Starcross, Stationfall and Hitchhikers Guide to the Galaxy)

Reception
Next Generation reviewed the PC version of the game, rating it five stars out of five, and stated that "Simply put, these are some of the greatest adventure games of all time. [...] if you want to have anything approaching a complete game library, you'll need to grab all of these."

References

Infocom games
Video games developed in the United States